Nélson de Souza, also commonly known as Nélson Monteiro (born 22 April 1904, date of death unknown), was a Brazilian basketball player. He competed in the men's tournament at the 1936 Summer Olympics.

References

1904 births
Year of death missing
Brazilian men's basketball players
Olympic basketball players of Brazil
Basketball players at the 1936 Summer Olympics
Place of birth missing